Krakatoa is a volcano in Indonesia.

Krakatoa may also refer to:
 1883 eruption of Krakatoa
 Anak Krakatoa, a new island rising from the remains of the 1883 Krakatoa eruption
 Krakatoa archipelago adjacent islands and features

Arts, entertainment and media

Films
 Krakatoa, a 1933 American short documentary film
 Krakatit, a 1948 science fiction film directed by Otakar Vávra based on the 1922 novel by Karel Čapek
 Krakatoa, East of Java, a 1969 American adventure and disaster film set against the backdrop of the Krakatoa eruption
 Krakatoa: The Last Days, a 2006 film about the Krakatoa eruption
 Krakatoa, a 2008 TV movie starring Pavel Douglas

Literature
 Krakatoa, East of Java (1969); a novelization of the 1969 movie by Michael Avallone
 Krakatoa: The Day the World Exploded (2005), a book by Simon Winchester

Music
 Krakatoa, a 1970s band with which Hans Zimmer began his career playing keyboards and synthesizers 
 "Krakatoa", a song by heavy metal band Saxon; See Saxon discography
 "Krakatoa", a mostly-spoken song by Styx on their album The Serpent Is Rising
 "Krakatau", an instrumental song by guitarist Yngwie Malmsteen on his 1988 album Odyssey

Other uses
 Krakatoa (explosive), a demolitions device
 Krakatoa, a volumetric particle rendering toolkit by Thinkbox Software; See List of mergers and acquisitions by Amazon
 Krakatau Steel, a steelworks in Indonesia
 Krakatau Steel Stadium, a multi-purpose stadium in Cilegon, Banten, Indonesia
 Krakatau Wajatama, a subsidiary of Krakatau Steel
 Krakatauia, a genus of flies in the family Dolichopodidae

Resources
 Krakatoa documentary and historical materials